Mary Wondrausch  (17 December 1923 – 26 December 2016) was an English artist, potter, historian and writer, born in Chelsea. She trained as a potter at Farnham School of Art, latterly West Surrey College of Art and Design.

She was an honorary fellow of the Craft Potters Association and has work in the V&A Museum collection. She was awarded the OBE for services to the Arts in 2000. Her primary interest is continental peasant art. Originally training as a watercolor artist, she later became interested in ceramics and opened her own pottery workshop in 1974. Inspired by 17th-century English slipware and Eastern European designs, such influences have informed her own work. She is known for lettering and exuberant use of colour. 

Her Brickfields pottery is in Compton, near Guildford, Surrey, where she moved in 1955 and subsequently raised three children.

Portrait of Wondrausch
Mary Wondrausch agreed to sit for Jon Edgar for a portrait work using clay quarried from the foundations of her house at Brickfields. This forms part of the Compton Triptych unveiled at the Human Clay exhibition, University of Surrey in November 2011.

Wondrausch and her house in Surrey, including the artist's hand-stencilled walls, hand-painted furniture, and ceramics collection, were photographed by Liesa Siegelman for World of Interiors in May 1988 to accompany an autobiographic piece by Wandrausch. That article was reprinted by the magazine in 2018.

Works in public collections
Dead Magpie (1956) mixed media on board. Collection of Surrey County Council

Selected writings
 Mary Wondrausch on Slipware (1986; second edition 2001; publisher; A&C Black - 1st ed. . 2nd ed. )
 Brickfields: My Life at Brickfields As a Potter, Painter, Gardener, Writer and Cook (2004)
 Hartley, Dorothy Rosaman (1893–1985) by Mary Wondrausch; Oxford Dictionary of National Biography, Oxford University Press, 2004

Contributions to symposia
 POTTED CHAR Mary Wondrausch (p. 227-234) SYMPOSIUM ON FOOD AND COOKERY 1994 PROCEEDINGS: Studies in Foods and Dishes at Risk. Edited by Harlan Walker; 245 pages.(Acanthus)
SPICE CONTAINERS AND SALT CONTAINERS Mary Wondrausch (p. 285-289) OXFORD SYMPOSIUM ON FOOD AND COOKERY 1992 PROCEEDINGS Studies of Flavourings - Ancient and Modern. Edited by Harlan Walker; 294 pages.(Acanthus)

External links
 Reading University Museum of English Rural Life archive film (2006)
 National Electronic and Video Archive of the Crafts; Wondrausch film and audio interview listings
 RECORDING THE CRAFTS: CERAMICS: MARY WONDRAUSCH (1996) University of West of England, Producer: Mike Hughes BFI

References

1923 births
2016 deaths
English potters
Officers of the Order of the British Empire
People from Chelsea, London
People from the Borough of Guildford
Women potters
British women ceramicists